Marske United Football Club is a football club based in Marske-by-the-Sea, North Yorkshire, England.

History

The club was established in 1956 by members of Marske Cricket Club. They initially played in the Cleveland League and then the South Bank League before moving up to the Teesside League in 1976. The club won both the Teesside League and the North Riding County Cup in 1980–81. They were league champions again in 1984–85, after which the club moved up to the Wearside League. The following season saw the club win the North Riding County Cup for a second time. They won the League Cup in 1992–93.

Marske were runners-up in the Wearside League in 1993–94 and 1994–95, a season that also saw them win the North Riding Senior Cup and the League Cup. They went on to win the Wearside League title in 1995–96, as well as retaining the League Cup. After finishing as runners-up again in 1996–97, the club were promoted to Division Two of the Northern League. In their first season in Division Two they finished third, and were promoted to Division One. The club were relegated back to Division Two at the end of the 2003–04 season, but were promoted to Division One in 2010–11 after finishing third. They won the League Cup in 2013–14 and were Northern League champions the following season, declining promotion to the Northern Premier League. The club were Division One runners-up in 2015–16. In 2017–18 they reached the semi-finals of the FA Vase, losing 3–2 on aggregate to Stockton Town.

The 2017–18 season saw Marske win the Division One title again, earning promotion to Division One East of the Northern Premier League. In 2019–20 the club won the North Riding Senior Cup for the second time, defeating Thornaby 6–0. In 2021–22 they finished second in Division One East, qualifying for the promotion play-offs. After beating Shildon in the semi-finals, they defeated local rivals Stockton Town 2–1 in final to secure promotion to the Premier Division.

List of managers
1976–1978: Dave Bice
1978–1981: John Smith
1981–1982: John Symon
1982–1987: Derek Walker
1987–1991: Dave Welch
1991–1997: Allan Marples
1997–2001: Charlie Bell
2001–2003: Mick Hodgson
2004–2005: Darren Trotter 
2005–2008: Charlie Bell
2008–2012: Paul Burton
2012: Craig Gibbin
2012–2014: Ted Watts
2014–2022: Carl Jarrett
2022–2023: Curtis Woodhouse
2023–present: Carl Jarrett

Honours
Northern League
Division One champions 2014–15, 2017–18
League Cup winners 2013–14
Wearside League
Champions 1994–95
League Cup winners 1994–95
Teesside League
Champions 1980–81, 1984–85
North Riding Senior Cup
Winners 1994–95, 2019–20
North Riding County Cup
Winners 1980–81, 1985–86
Monkwearmouth Charity Cup
Winners 1992–93, 1995–96
Sunderland Shipowners Cup
Winners 1995–96, 1996–97

Records
Best FA Cup performance: Fourth qualifying round, 2013–14, 2020–21, 2021–22
Best FA Trophy performance: Fourth round, 2022–23
Best FA Vase performance: Semi-finals, 2017–18
Biggest win: 16–0 vs North Shields, Wearside League, April 1994
Heaviest defeat: 3–9
Most appearances: Mike Kinnair, 583
Most goals: Chris Morgan, 169

See also
Marske United F.C. players
Marske United F.C. managers

References

External links
Official website

 
Football clubs in England
Football clubs in North Yorkshire
Association football clubs established in 1956
1956 establishments in England
Teesside Football League
Wearside Football League
Northern Football League
Northern Premier League clubs